

Events
October – Treaty of Windsor is made between Henry II of England and Ruaidrí Ua Conchobair, High King of Ireland, who agrees to rule unoccupied territory as a vassal.

References